Tecpan de Galeana    is one of the 81 municipalities of Guerrero, in south-western Mexico. The municipal seat lies at Tecpan de Galeana.

As of 2005, the municipality had a total population of 52,848.

See also 
 Hurricane Tara (1961)
 Mexican Federal Highway 200

References

Municipalities of Guerrero